Foll may refer to:

 Harry Foll, an Australian politician
 Stéphane Le Foll, a French politician
 The Followers in Australian rules football

See also

 Folle
 Folles